The following is a list of single-game baseball records and unusual events. The following criteria are used for inclusion:

Only events occurring within a single plate appearance, inning, or game are included; cumulative or aggregate records achieved over more than one game are not listed.
Events occurring during post-season play are included, but events occurring during an All-Star Game are not included.

Individual batting/hitting 
Four home runs in a game. Number of occurrences: 18. Most recently, J.D. Martinez, September 4, 2017.
2 grand slams in an inning. Number of occurrences: 1. Fernando Tatís, April 23, 1999
1 grand slam from each side of the plate in the same game. Number of occurrences: 1. Bill Mueller, July 29, 2003
Grand slam on first career pitch. Number of occurrences: 2. Kevin Kouzmanoff, September 2, 2006; Daniel Nava, June 12, 2010.
Home runs from both sides of the plate in the same inning.  Number of occurrences: 3. Carlos Baerga, April 8, 1993; Mark Bellhorn, August 29, 2002; Kendrys Morales, July 30, 2012.
Grand slam in MLB debut game. Number of occurrences: 7. Bill Duggleby, April 21, 1898; Bobby Bonds, June 25, 1968; Chase Utley, April 24, 2003; Jeremy Hermida, August 31, 2005; Kevin Kouzmanoff, September 2, 2006; Daniel Nava, June 12, 2010; Brandon Crawford, May 27, 2011.
19 total bases in a game. Number of occurrences: 1. Shawn Green, May 23, 2002 (4 home runs, a double and a single).
9 hits in a game. Number of occurrences: 1. Johnny Burnett, July 10, 1932. (18 inning game)
7 hits in a nine-inning game. Number of occurrences: 2. Wilbert Robinson, June 10, 1892; Rennie Stennett, September 16, 1975.
Three hits in an inning. Number of occurrences: 5. Last by Johnny Damon, June 27, 2003.
4 triples in a game. Number of occurrences: 2. George Strief, June 25, 1885; Bill Joyce, May 18, 1897.
7 times on base in a game without a swing. Number of occurrences: 1. Bryce Harper, May 8, 2016. (13 innings).
4 Intentional walks in a nine-inning game. Number of occurrences: 2. Barry Bonds, May 1, 2004 and September 22, 2004.
5 Intentional walks in an extra-inning game. Number of occurrences: 1. Andre Dawson, May 22, 1990.
7 runs scored in a game. Number of occurrences: 1. Guy Hecker, August 15, 1886.
3 runs scored in an inning. Number of occurrences: 3. Sammy White, June 18, 1953, Tom Burns and Ned Williamson (both in the same game for the Chicago Colts), September 6, 1883.
12 RBIs in a single game. Number of occurrences: 2. Jim Bottomley, September 16, 1924; Mark Whiten, September 7, 1993.
Hitting into 4 double plays in a game. Number of occurrences: 3. Goose Goslin, April 28, 1934; Joe Torre, July 21, 1975; Víctor Martínez, September 11, 2011.
Three sacrifice flies in a game. Number of occurrences: 12. Most recently, José López, April 15, 2008.

Collective batting/hitting

Individual pitching 
20 strikeouts in a nine-inning game. Number of occurrences: 5. Roger Clemens 1986 and 1996 struck out 20. Kerry Wood in 1998. Most recently, Max Scherzer, May 11, 2016. In 2001, Randy Johnson also struck out 20 in a 9-inning start, but the game went on to extra innings.
21 strikeouts in a game of any length. Number of occurrences: 1. Tom Cheney, September 12, 1962 (pitched 16 innings of a 16-inning game).
26 innings pitched in a game. Number of occurrences: 2. Leon Cadore and Joe Oeschger, May 1, 1920. (Same game.)
4 consecutive home runs allowed. Number of occurrences: 5. Paul Foytack, July 31, 1963; Chase Wright, April 22, 2007, Dave Bush, August 11, 2010, Michael Blazek, July 27, 2017, and Craig Stammen, June 9, 2019.
7 home runs allowed in a game. Number of occurrences: 1. Charlie Sweeney, June 12, 1886.
6 wild pitches in one game.  Number of occurrences: 3.  Most recently, Bill Gullickson, October 4, 1982. Bert Cunningham of the 1890 Players' League threw five wild pitches in a single inning.
26 hits allowed in a game. Number of occurrences: 1. Allan Travers, May 18, 1912.
29 hits allowed in an extra-inning game. Number of occurrences: 1. Eddie Rommel (17 innings), July 10, 1932.
Oldest pitcher to win a game. Jamie Moyer, age , May 16, 2012.
Most innings pitched by a relief pitcher in one game. Zip Zabel,  innings. June 17, 1915
Fastest recorded pitch thrown by a pitcher in a game. Aroldis Chapman, . September 24, 2010.
Slowest recorded pitch thrown by a pitcher in a game. Brock Holt, . August 7, 2021.

Collective pitching 
 26 strikeouts in a game of any length. Number of occurrences: 4. New York Mets, August 23, 2019 (in a 14-inning game);  Los Angeles Dodgers, June 2, 2017 (in a 12-inning game); Chicago Cubs, May 7, 2017 (in an 18-inning game); and California Angels, July 9, 1971 (in a 20-inning game).
 Most strikeouts in a game of any length by both teams. 48 in an 18-inning game between the Cubs and Yankees on May 7, 2017

Scoring 
 Highest combined score: 49. Chicago Cubs (26) over Philadelphia Phillies (23), August 25, 1922.
 Highest score, one team: 30. Texas Rangers (30) vs. Baltimore Orioles (3), August 22, 2007.

Fielding 
Team executes two triple plays in a game. Number of occurrences: 1. Minnesota Twins, July 17, 1990.
Shortstop plays doubleheader without an official chance. Number of occurrences: 1. Toby Harrah, June 25, 1976.
Unassisted triple play. Number of occurrences: 15.  Most recently, Eric Bruntlett, August 23, 2009.
Three errors on one play. Number of occurrences: 4. Most recently committed by Los Angeles Dodgers vs San Diego Padres, September 8, 2014. Yasiel Puig bungled a throw to first base. A. J. Ellis then torpedoed the throw into left field, and then on the relay to home plate, Hanley Ramírez threw the ball past a diving Clayton Kershaw to complete the trifecta of errors.

Baserunning

See also
Baseball record holders

Notes 

Major League Baseball records
Baseball pitching